Tim Ward (born February 23, 1994) is an American professional dirt track and stock car racing driver. Ward predominantly competes in dirt modified competition.

Racing career

He won the DIRTcar Modified Series Rookie of the Year award in 2008. In 2018, Ward made his NASCAR K&N Pro Series West debut in the 2018 Star Nursery 100 at the Las Vegas Motor Speedway Dirt Track. He placed fourth in his heat race and fourteenth place in the main event. He later competed in the 2019 Eldora Dirt Derby, where he placed fifth in his heat race and sixteenth in the main event.

Motorsports career results

NASCAR
(key) (Bold – Pole position awarded by qualifying time. Italics – Pole position earned by points standings or practice time. * – Most laps led.)

Gander Outdoors Truck Series

K&N Pro Series West

 Season still in progress
 Ineligible for series points

References

External links
 

Living people
1994 births
People from Webster County, Iowa
Racing drivers from Iowa
NASCAR drivers